Lafleche or La Fleche (French: , The Arrow) may refer to:

 Laflèche (surname), a surname
 La Flèche (chicken), a chicken breed
 La Fleche (horse) (1889–1916), a British Thoroughbred racehorse and broodmare
 La Flèche Wallonne, a cycle road race in Belgium
 Collège Laflèche, a private college in Trois-Rivières, Quebec, Canada
 La Flèche (P32), a vessel of the Seychelles Coast Guard

Places 
 La Flèche, a municipality in the department of Sarthe, Pays de la Loire, France
 Lafleche, Saskatchewan, a town in Saskatchewan, Canada
 Laflèche, Quebec, a neighbourhood of Longueuil, Quebec, Canada
 Arrondissement of La Flèche, Pays de la Loire, France

See also 
 Flèche (disambiguation)